Omid Ahmadisafa (born 24 September 1992) is an Iranian kickboxer who competed for Iran Kickboxing National Team.

Biography 
Omid Ahmadi Safa was born in 1992 in Tehran. He is one of the most proud martial artists and a former member of Iran's national boxing and kickboxing teams, who has won colorful medals in boxing and kickboxing. The news of "Omid Ahmadi Safa's" asylum in Germany was published in the media on November 5, 2021, and was confirmed by himself. Unfortunately, he left Iran for Germany forever.

He was able to win important medals in the Asian and world competitions. Ahmadi Safa succeeded in defeating his great opponent in the finals of the World King Boxing Championship held in Italy and won the world gold medal. He also won the world gold medal in 2017. He managed to defeat his Turkish opponent in the Asian Games and go to the finals, but he lost to the Kazakh opponent in the finals and won the silver medal in Asia.

Ahmadisafa In 2021,has received permission from Iran's boxing federation to travel to Italy, where he left his hotel and never returned. He is now training and living in Germany.

Championships and awards 

 WAKO World Championship
  2017 WAKO World Muay Thai Championship
  2015 WAKO Asian Championship
  2020 World Muay Thai Championship

See also 

 List of WBC Muaythai world champions
 List of Muay Thai practitioners
 List of male kickboxers

References

External links

Living people
1992 births
Iranian male kickboxers
Iranian male boxers
Sportspeople from Tehran
Heavyweight kickboxers
Iranian strength athletes
Heavyweight boxers
Boxers at the 2018 Asian Games